Basil Soper (c. 1938 – 1 June 2013) was a British actor and voice-over artist. He was best known for his work on the Basil Brush show and famous for presenting "The Personal Injury Helpline" adverts.

In 2007, it was suggested that Soper was the inspiration for Peter Serafinowicz's character Brian Butterfield in BBC2's The Peter Serafinowicz Show. Butterfield is shown as a bumbling Private Investigator in a parody of Soper's Personal Injury Helpline adverts.

He also provided a voice over for the cinematic trailer of 'The Almighty Clean Up Of Hooliganism.'

External links

 Retrieved on 2006-08-20.
 http://announce.jpress.co.uk/27837821-obituary-soper-basil

1930s births
2013 deaths
British male voice actors
Place of birth missing